Wilbert Ross Aylesworth (14 July 1892 – February 5, 1973) was a Canadian politician, farmer and merchant. 

He was elected in 1940 as a Member of the National Government to the House of Commons of Canada to represent the riding of Frontenac—Addington. He was re-elected to the same riding in 1945 and 1949 as a Member of the Progressive Conservative. He lost when he ran in 1953 for the riding of Kingston. Prior to his federal political career, he was elected to Kingston Township, Ontario as councillor, reeve and deputy reeve between 1924 and 1940. He was also a councillor in Frontenac County, Ontario between 1926 and 1940.

References

External links 

1892 births
1973 deaths
Conservative Party of Canada (1867–1942) MPs
Members of the House of Commons of Canada from Ontario
Progressive Conservative Party of Canada MPs
Unionist Party (Canada) MPs
People from Kingston, Ontario